A Bright Cold Day is the debut album by American trip hop duo Dutch, which consists of Jedi Mind Tricks producer Stoupe the Enemy of Mankind and singer Liz Fullerton. The album was released on June 8, 2010 under Enemy Soil.

Track listing
Source: HipHopUG

References

External links 
 Enemy Soil - Dutch

Enemy Soil Records albums
2010 debut albums
Trip hop albums by American artists
Underground hip hop albums